Helechal is a barrio in the municipality of Barranquitas, Puerto Rico. Its population in 2010 was 4,073.

History
Puerto Rico was ceded by Spain in the aftermath of the Spanish–American War under the terms of the Treaty of Paris of 1898 and became an unincorporated territory of the United States. In 1899, the United States Department of War conducted a census of Puerto Rico finding that the population of Helechal barrio was 1,485.

Features and sites
In Helechal there are two airplanes which have been converted into a restaurant called , which is visited by tourists and locals alike. The place is accessed by going over a rope bridge.

Gallery

See also

 List of communities in Puerto Rico

References

External links
 

Barrios of Barranquitas, Puerto Rico